The 2017 CAF Champions League knockout stage was played from 8 September to 4 November 2017. A total of eight teams competed in the knockout stage to decide the champions of the 2017 CAF Champions League.

Qualified teams
The winners and runners-up of each of the four groups in the group stage advanced to the quarter-finals.

Format

In the knockout stage, the eight teams played a single-elimination tournament. Each tie was played on a home-and-away two-legged basis. If the aggregate score was tied after the second leg, the away goals rule would be applied, and if still tied, extra time would not be played, and the penalty shoot-out would be used to determine the winner (Regulations III. 26 & 27).

Schedule
The schedule of each round was as follows.

The calendar was amended from the original one for the following dates:
Quarter-finals first leg: moved from 8–10 September to 15–17 September
Quarter-finals second leg: moved from 15–17 September to 22–24 September
Semi-finals second leg: moved from 13–15 October to 20–22 October

Bracket
The bracket of the knockout stage was determined as follows:

The order of legs for the semi-finals and final was decided by an additional draw held after the group stage draw on 26 April 2017, 14:00 EET (UTC+2), at the CAF Headquarters in Cairo, Egypt.

Quarter-finals

In the quarter-finals, the winners of one group played the runners-up of another group, with the group winners hosting the second leg.

|}

Étoile du Sahel won 2–0 on aggregate.

Al-Ahly won 4–3 on aggregate.

1–1 on aggregate. USM Alger won on away goals.

1–1 on aggregate. Wydad AC won 3–2 on penalties.

Semi-finals

In the semi-finals, the four quarter-final winners played in two ties, with the order of legs decided by an additional draw held after the group stage draw.

|}

Al-Ahly won 7–4 on aggregate.

Wydad AC won 3–1 on aggregate.

Final

In the final, the two semi-final winners played each other, with the order of legs decided by an additional draw held after the group stage draw.

Wydad Casablanca won 2–1 on aggregate.

Notes

References

External links
Total Champions League 2017, CAFonline.com

3
September 2017 sports events in Africa
October 2017 sports events in Africa
November 2017 sports events in Africa